Richard Orrell (1875–1919) was an English footballer who played in the Football League for Preston North End.

References

1875 births
1919 deaths
English footballers
Association football defenders
English Football League players
Preston North End F.C. players
Plymouth Argyle F.C. players
Southport F.C. players
Great Harwood F.C. players